Tennis on NBC is the de facto branding used for broadcasts of major professional tennis tournaments that are produced by NBC Sports, the sports division of the NBC television network in the United States. The network has broadcast tennis events since 1955.

The network's tennis coverage normally airs during the afternoon; however for several weeks in the summer, its Sunday coverage during the morning hours of Grand Slam tennis tournaments may start as early as 8:00 a.m., resulting in the pre-emption of regular programming on that day (such as the political talk show Meet the Press).

Overview
NBC's relationship with tennis dates as far back as August 9, 1939. While at the amateur Eastern Grass Court Championships, in Rye, New York, NBC broadcast the first ever televised tennis match. NBC made history again at the 1955 Davis Cup, where they televised the first tennis match (United States vs. Australia) in color.

US Nationals coverage
NBC broadcast the US Nationals as early as 1952 and up until 1964. Bud Palmer, Jack Kramer, Lindsey Nelson, Don Budge, Bill Stern and Bill Talbert were among the commentators during this period.

Wimbledon coverage
NBC broadcast The Championships, Wimbledon beginning 1969. Americans had made a tradition of NBC's "Breakfast at Wimbledon" specials during the tournament on weekends, in which live coverage (which under the guidance of then-NBC Sports executive producer Don Ohlmeyer and associate producer Bob Basche, began in 1979 for the men's rounds and in 1982 for the women) started early in the morning (as the Eastern Time Zone in the United States is five hours behind the United Kingdom) and continued well into the afternoon, interspersed with commentary and interviews from Bud Collins, whose tennis acumen and patterned trousers are well known to tennis fans in the United States. Collins was fired by NBC in 2007, but was promptly hired by ESPN, which holds the Wimbledon cable rights. For many years, NBC's primary host was Dick Enberg, who called his 28th and final Wimbledon in 2011.

The AELTC grew frustrated with NBC's policy of waiting to begin its quarterfinal and semifinal coverage until after the conclusion of Today at 10 a.m. local, as well as broadcasting live only to the Eastern Time Zone and using tape-delay in all others. NBC also held over high-profile matches for delayed broadcast in its window, regardless of any ongoing matches. In one notorious incident in 2009, ESPN2's coverage of the Tommy Haas-Novak Djokovic quarterfinal was forced off the air nationwide when it ran past 10 a.m. Eastern, after which NBC showed the conclusion of the match on tape only after presenting the previous Ivo Karlović-Roger Federer quarterfinal in full.

The 2011 tournament marked the 43rd and final year of NBC's coverage. NBC issued a statement saying it had been outbid for the rights to future broadcasts, and beginning with the 2012 tournament, all live coverage moved exclusively to ESPN. Wimbledon became the second tennis Grand Slam event (after the Australian Open) to air live coverage in the United States exclusively on pay television, although replays of the tournament finals have aired on broadcast network ABC.

French Open coverage
NBC's coverage of the French Open began in 1975. Other than a three-year stint for the tournament on CBS, NBC has remained the U.S. broadcast television home of the French Open since 1983. The network shows weekend morning early-round matches in the afternoon on tape-delay; however, if a match is still being played, it will televise the match live. NBC's current deal for the tournament does not allow ESPN2 or Tennis Channel to show NBC's tape-delayed matches. NBC also tape-delays the men's semifinal, broadcasting it in the late morning on the same day, however it broadcasts both finals live.

On August 5, 2012, NBC announced it had extended its broadcast agreement through 2024. Under the terms of this new deal, NBC would broadcast an additional ten hours of live coverage, including matches on Memorial Day and the women's semifinals. With the United States Tennis Association (USTA) agreeing to an eleven-year deal with ESPN for exclusive broadcast rights to the US Open, the French Open will be the only tennis tournament on American network television.

Olympic Games coverage

In 2004 and 2006, Bravo carried overnight and morning coverage of the Olympic Games from NBC Sports. In 2008, the channel did not carry any coverage, as NBCUniversal had acquired Oxygen, allowing Bravo to continue to carry its regular entertainment programming schedule during NBC's coverage of the Games. For the 2012 Summer Olympics, NBC Sports announced that Bravo would serve as the home of Olympic tennis events, providing 56 hours of coverage.

Commentators

 Julie Anthony (1976–1984)
 Jimmy Arias (2008)
 Tracy Austin
 Don Budge
 Mary Carillo (2003–present)
 Rosie Casals
 Bud Collins (1972–2007)
 Jimmy Connors (1990–1991)
 Donald Dell (1975–1985)
 Dick Enberg (1978–2000)
 Chris Evert (1990–2003)
 Gayle Gardner (1987–1993)
 Mike Gorman (1992)
 Brett Haber (2012, 2016)
 Julie Heldman (1973–1978)
 Dan Hicks (2019–present)
 Charlie Jones
 Jack Kramer
 Bill Macatee (1982–1989)
 Barry MacKay (2008)
 John McEnroe (1992–present)
 Lindsey Nelson
 John Newcombe
 Bud Palmer
 Ted Robinson (2000–2018)
 Tim Ryan
 Jim Simpson (?–1979)
 Bill Stern
 Hannah Storm (1992–2002)
 Bill Talbert
 Maria Taylor (2022–present)
 Mike Tirico (2019)

On-screen graphics
NBC Sports first switched to digital on-screen graphics in 1995, although in a very limited, text-based form. A modernized graphics package for the telecasts rolled out in 1999, based around translucent black rectangles, with beveled gold bars at the top and bottom, with blue accents for most sports (green for golf, purple for Wimbledon, and orange for the tennis French Open). Scoring bugs were still not a permanent feature, as they disappeared during plays until 2005, when the network introduced horizontal scorebars for its coverage of college football and hockey, which did not match the other graphics. The graphics, which still did not have any animation, were modified in 2002 to feature rounded edges, and the translucent color was changed from black to the color of the accents, which also replaced gold as the border color.

References

External links
 
 Fang's Bites: NBC’s 43 Year History With Wimbledon
 Tennis on NBC | Sports Media Watch

NBC
NBC Sports
1955 American television series debuts
1960s American television series
1970s American television series
1980s American television series
1990s American television series
2000s American television series
2010s American television series
2020s American television series
NBC original programming